The Otto Gelsted Prize (Otto Gelsted-prisen) is a Danish literary award which was founded in 1970 by the Otto Gelsted Memorial Fund (Otto Gelsteds Mindefond), heir of the Danish author Otto Gelsted (1888–1968).  The prize is awarded annually by the Danish Academy; it is currently 65,000 DKK.

Recipients

References

External links
Otto Gelsteds Mindefond website
Danish literary awards
1970 establishments in Denmark
Awards established in 1970